Ruth Blaney Alexander (May 18, 1905 – September 18, 1930) was an early female pilot in the United States who established several records in altitude and distance during 1929 and 1930.

Youth
Ruth Blaney was raised in Irving, Kansas in Marshall County by parents William T. and Lillian F. Blaney. Ruth had a natural interest in mechanics and assisted her father who ran a hardware store. Her first flight in an airplane occurred on July 4, 1920 when she took a ride with a local barnstormer at the age of 15. Searching for her career path, she worked at a general store and at a beauty parlor near Kansas City. She married briefly in 1925 but the marriage was annulled soon afterwards. On June 16, 1925 she married Mac P. Alexander, a farmer from Olathe, Kansas. They lived together for two years but separated due to irreconcilable differences. In roughly 1927, Ruth fell from a horse, breaking her shoulder, several ribs, and several fingers. During her recovery she nearly died from pneumonia but surprised her doctors by making a full recovery. After this, she divorced Mac Alexander, and move to San Diego, California in order to pursue aviation. At the time, San Diego, California went by the nickname "Air Capital of the West."

Flight school
Arriving in San Diego, Ruth worked as a beautician to save up sufficient funds for flight school. However, at precisely the same time, the editor of the local San Diego Sun newspaper announced a contest to encourage women's participation in aviation – the winner of the "Miss Air Capital of the West" contest would receive a free full course of instruction at the Ryan Flying School (a cost of $1375, roughly $ in  dollars). Ruth entered the contest along with approximately 60 other women and was one of the ten finalist, but did not finish in the top three.  A 19-year-old San Diegan named Peaches Wallace placed first.  However, Ruth was undaunted and took stock of her assets and determined that she had sacrificed and saved enough nickels and dimes to pay for her  tuition and enrolled at the Ryan Flying School. These activities were reported regularly in the San Diego Sun. Ruth's instruction began on September 9, 1929 at Ryan Field (Dutch Flats), the same airport from which Charles Lindbergh had used to start his journey in the Spirit of St. Louis in 1927. Ruth made her first solo flight on October 25, 1929 and completed her training on November 11, 1929, the first Kansan to graduate from the Ryan school. On November 17, 1929 she became the 65th licensed woman pilot in the U.S., also attaining her FAI license the same day.

World record for altitude
Less than 24 hours after attaining her license, Alexander took off from Ryan Field on November 18, 1929, in a Great Lakes biplane and continued climbing to what she believed was an altitude of better than 18,000 feet over the skies of San Diego. This was later recognized as a new official world record altitude for women in light planes of 15,718 feet, generating considerable notoriety not only for herself but San Diego and the Ryan Flying School. She was hailed as a local hero and given a special banquet by the San Diego Chamber of Commerce on November 22, 1929 and met with Mayor Harry C. Clark. In December, she was flown on a special flight to Oakland, California for a special lunch in her honor with Amelia Earhart. After the lunch, Ruth was flown in a Ford Trimotor around the Bay area and offered the chance to pilot the aircraft, reportedly becoming the third woman in the US to have done so.

Gliding
After witnessing the gliding instruction of William Hawley Bowlus at Lindbergh Field in primary gliders, Ruth expressed an interest in becoming the first woman in the U.S. to earn a glider license. However, shortly thereafter, Anne Morrow Lindbergh visited San Diego and took instruction from Bowlus, becoming the first woman to receive a first-class glider license in the U.S. On February 16, 1930, Ruth Alexander qualified for a United States second-class glider license from the slopes of Mount Soledad, near La Jolla, California. In doing so she followed Anne Morrow Lindbergh as the second woman in the United States to achieve this distinction. Alexander made a perfect flight using a primary glider lasting 2 minutes 33 and 2/5 seconds. In the spring of 1930, she became a glider instructor and, in so doing, became the first woman in the United States to hold this position. She was a charter member of the Anne Lindbergh Gliders Club of San Diego and joined the Ninety-Nines organization of women pilots.

Commercial pilot's license
In March 1930, Ruth was granted a commercial pilot's license. Given Ruth's growing national fame, a contingent from Kansas travelled to California to meet her including Kansas Governor Clyde M. Reed, other politicians, Fred Trigg the editor of the Kansas City Star, and others. Ruth's first official passenger was Governor Reed on a flight from Ryan Field.

Another world record for altitude
On July 4, 1930, Ruth Alexander flew a Nicholas-Beazley NB-3 (Barling NB-3) light aircraft (serial number 52, U.S. Department of Commerce registration number 880M) to 21,000 feet; this was not confirmed as an official record owing to problems with the official barograph. Her altitude had exceeded the rating for the barograph drum. On July 11, 1930, Alexander took off at 1:34 p.m. in the same Barling from Lindbergh Field. After briefly losing consciousness at extreme altitudes despite using an oxygen tube, she established a new world record in light planes (for both men and women) of 26,600 feet at the apex of the flight. The American record held prior to this flight was set by D. S. Zimmerly (male) at an altitude of 24,074 feet over St. Louis, Missouri on February 16, 1930.  Later in July, Ruth became the first woman in the US to become an air deputy.

Three flags flights
In July 1930, Ruth proposed to fly from Mexico to Canada via the U.S. – a "three flags flight" along the west coast air route. Tex Rankin had established a speed record over this route and Ruth wished to exceed it. In addition, Ruth looked to become the first woman to make a round trip flight from Canada to Mexico, and the first woman to fly from Canada to Mexico non-stop. Her northbound route started on August 27, 1930 from Agua Caliente, Tijuana, Mexico to San Diego and then Los Angeles. On August 28 she continued from Los Angeles to Oakland, then Portland. And on August 29, she completed the northbound leg to Seattle before finally landing at Vancouver (Lulu Island).

The return leg on August 31 started at roughly 3:20 a.m. from Vancouver and concluded back at Agua Caliente at 7:15 p.m. for a total flight time of 15 hours, 54 minutes, 30 seconds. The 1,460 mile journey was flown at an average speed of 91.25 mph which was the fastest time by a woman on the route but not faster than Rankin's prior 14 hours and 37 minutes. The flight earned NAA records for distance over a specified air route by a woman, and a speed record over the course by a woman.

Journey home
In September, 1930 Ruth wrote to her parents in Irving that she was planning to fly from San Diego to Wichita, Kansas, continuing from there to New York City, with return stops at various cities on the east coast before returning to San Diego in October. Arrangements were made for her to meet the Lindberghs and the Mayor of New York upon her arrival. Given the flight was sponsored by the Agua Caliente Company, the flight originated at the Agua Caliente Race Track before continuing to Lindbergh Field and then east to Wichita. Her takeoff from Agua Caliente at 1:05 a.m. on September 18, 1930 was uneventful, leading to a landing at Lindbergh Field shortly thereafter. Topped off with fuel, she once again took off at 3:28 a.m. from Lindbergh Field but instead of completing her cross-country journey she entered low clouds and fog, is believed to have tip stalled, and crashed at Plumosa Park in Loma Portal, San Diego just west of the airport. The crash was at such a high speed that she died instantly upon impact. Her passing made local, national, and international news. She was eulogized as a "pioneer of the airways of this epic age." During her aviation career Ruth flew biplanes, monoplanes, transport aircraft, gliders, and even a Goodyear blimp. She is buried at Greenwood Cemetery in Blue Rapids, Kansas.

References

General references
Carlson, D (1978) "Women in San Diego...a History in Photographs" The Journal of San Diego History, Vo. XXIV, No. 3.
Fogel, Gary (2001) "Wind and Wings: The History of Soaring in San Diego" RockReef Press, San Diego, California.
Fogel, Gary and Lindemer, Grant (2007) "Ruth Blaney Alexander: A Dream of Wings" Quiet Flyer, Vol. No. 8, pp. 22–27.
Fogel, Gary (2019) "Ruth Blaney Alexander" AIAA SciTech 2019 Forum, San Diego, AIAA-2019-0122.

External links
Ruth Alexander at Flickr Commons via San Diego Air and Space Museum
Story on Ruth Alexander's gliding accomplishments
 Burial Memorial - Find a Grave

1905 births
1930 deaths
Accidental deaths in California
American aviation record holders
American women aviation record holders
American glider pilots
Aviation pioneers
Aviators from Kansas
Aviators killed in aviation accidents or incidents in the United States
Flight altitude record holders
Flight distance record holders
Gliding in the United States
Victims of aviation accidents or incidents in 1930
20th-century American women